Julio Enrique Moreno (October 20, 1879–April 2, 1952) was Acting President of Ecuador from March to April 1926 and again from August to September 1940.

He was President of the Senate from August 1940 to February 1942.

External links 
 Official Website about President's History of the Ecuadorian Government

1879 births
1952 deaths
Presidents of Ecuador
Presidents of the Senate of Ecuador
People from Quito